This is family tree of the Dutch (De) Graeff family (also: Graeff and De Graeff van Polsbroek). The House De Graeff is an alleged cadet branch of the House Von Graben that descended from the Austrian noble Wolfgang von Graben (1465–1521).

Dutch family tree 
 Wolfgang von Graben (1465–1521)
 Pieter Graeff (born around 1484)
 Jan Pietersz Graeff (before 1512–1553)
 Pieter Jansz Graeff (died around 1547)
 Cornelis Pietersz Graeff
 Lenaert Jansz de Graeff (around 1525/30–before 1578)
 Steyntje Leonardsdr de Graeff
 Pieter Leonardsz de Graeff (named 1590) → Descendants
 Jannetje Leonardsdr de Graeff (1554–1619)
 Jan Leonhardsz de Graeff
 Weyntje Dircksz (de) Graeff
 Diederik Jansz. Graeff (1532–1589)
 Jan Dircksz Graeff (died 1627)
 Jacob Dircksz de Graeff (1571–1638)
 Cornelis de Graeff (1599–1664)
 Pieter de Graeff (1638–1707)
 Agneta de Graeff (1663–1725) 
 Cornelis de Graeff (1671–1719)
 Johan de Graeff (1673–1714)
 Jacoba Adriana de Graeff (1710–1745)
 Gerrit de Graeff van Zuid-Polsbroek (1711–1752)
 Joan de Graeff (1735-1754)
 Geertruid Joanna de Graeff (1740–1801)
 Gerrit de Graeff van Zuid-Polsbroek (1741–1811)
 Gerrit de Graeff van Zuid-Polsbroek (1766–1814)
 Christina Elisabeth de Graeff (born 1795)
 Gerrit de Graeff van Zuid-Polsbroek (1797–1870)
 Gerrit Arnold Theodoor de Graeff (1831–1889)
 Carolina Agnes Maria de Graeff van Polsbroek (born 1855)
 Gerrit (V) de Graeff van Polsbroek (born 1856)
 Henry George de Graeff van Polsbroek (1858–1941)
 Augusta Eustace de Graeff van Polsbroek
 Geraldine de Graeff van Polsbroek
 Theodore Lawrence Henry de Graeff van Polsbroek → Descendants
 Agnes Margaretha de Gaeff van Polsbroek (1859–1935)
 Joseph de Graeff van Polsbroek (born 1862) → Descendants
 Carolina Frederica Christina de Graeff (1832–1885)
 Pieter de Graeff
 Dirk de Graeff van Polsbroek (1833–1916)
 Pieter de Graeff (1861–1909) → Descendants
 Anna Carolina de Graeff (born 1871)
 Andries Cornelis Dirk de Graeff (1872–1957)
 Bonne Elisabeth Constance Wilhelmine de Graeff (1898–1987)
 Anne Maria de Graeff (born 1904)
 Jacob de Graeff (born 1921)
 Jan Jaap de Graeff (born 1949) → Descendants
 Géorg de Graeff (1873–1954)
 Dirk Georg de Graeff (1905–1986) → Descendants
 Herman Jacob de Graeff (1907–1978)
 Pieter Georg de Graeff (born 1934)
 Egbert Cornelis Christian de Graeff (1936–2017) → Descendants
 Martha Kinnema Wilhelmina de Graeff (born 1938)
 Christine Henriette de Graeff (born 1942)
 Andries Cornelis Dirk de Graeff (1909–1981) → Descendants
 Jacob de Graeff (1875–1963) → Descendants
 Carolina Frederika Christina de Graeff (born 1877)
 Cornelis de Graeff (1881–1956) → Descendants
 Frederik Lodewijk de Graeff (born 1837)
 Johanna Carolina Frederika de Graeff (born 1868)
 Emilie Maria Henriette de Graeff (born 1872)
 Gijsbert Carel Rutger Reinier de Graeff (1838-1923) 
 Willem Carel Dirk de Graeff (1868–1886) → Descendants
 Frederika Maria Cornelia de Graeff (born 1870)
 Carolina Albertina Azora Cosmopolita de Graeff (born 1872)
 Gijsbert Carel Rutger Reinier van Brienen van Ramerus de Graeff (born 1876) → Descendants
 Anna Margaretha de Graeff (1798–1824)
 Cornelia Maria de Graeff (1800–1876)
 Geertruid Elisabeth de Graeff (1776–1857)
 Elisabeth Jacoba de Graeff (1751–1802)
 Alida Johanna de Graeff (1713–1757)
 Agneta de Graeff
 Jacob de Graeff (1642–1690)
 Dirk de Graeff (1601–1637)
 Agneta de Graeff van Polsbroek (1603–1656)
 Hendrik de Graeff (born 1605)
 Wendela de Graeff (1607–1652)
 Christina de Graeff (1609–1679)
 Andries de Graeff (1611–1678)
 Cornelis de Graeff (1650–1678)
 Alida de Graeff (1651–1738)
 Arnoldina (Aertje) de Graeff (1652–1703)
 Pieter Dircksz Graeff (1573–1645)
 Cornelis Dircksz Graeff, alias van Rijn
 Jan Cornelisz (De) Graef(f)
 Neeltgen Jans Vercroft (not Graeff)
 Cornelis Pieter Jansz Graeff
 Jacob Jansz Graeff (died around 1580)
 Styntje Jacobsdr Graeff
 Jan Jacobsz Graeff (born around 1570/75)
 Claes Jansz Graeff
 Albert Claesz de Graeff (born around 1620)
 Adriana Jansdr Graeff (died after 1640)
 Maria Jansdr Graeff
 Cornelis Jansz Graeff
 Catharina Cornelisdr Graeff 
 Pieter Cornelisz Graeff (died 1679) → Descendants
 Jan Cornelisz (de) Graeff
 Cornelis Jansz de Graeff
 Catharina Cornelisdr de Graeff
 Pieter Cornelisz de Graeff (died 1693) → Descendants
 Jan Cornelisz de Graeff
 Cornelis Jansz de Graeff
 Jacob Jansz de Graeff → Descendants
 Cornelis Jansz de Graeff
 Jan Jansz de Graeff
 Cornelis Jansz de Graeff
 Maria Jansdr de Graeff
 Alida Jansdr de Graeff
 Cornelis Jansz de Graeff
 Alida Jansdr de Graeff
 Hendrica Jansdr de Graeff
 Pieter Jansz de Graeff
 Jan de Graeff (died 1751) (alleged) → unknown Descendants 
 Pieter de Graeff (died 1760) (alleged) → unknown Descendants 
 Jan Jansz de Graeff
 Apollonia Cornelisdr de Graeff
 Jacob Jansz de Graeff
 Cornelis Jansz de Graeff
 Pieter Jansz de Graeff
 Pieter de Graeff
 Joannis de Graeff
 Jan Jansz de Graeff
 Claes Jacobsz Graeff
 Adriaan Jacobsz Graeff (extramarital) → Descendants

See also 
 De Graeff
 Semisouverain fief of Zuid-Polsbroek
 Free and high fief of Purmerland and Ilpendam

External links 
 "Genealogie van het geslacht 'de Graeff' door W. H. Croockewit" (Family tree of the De Graeff family) at: De Nederlandsche leeuw: tijdschrift van het Koninklijk Nederlandsch Genootschap voor Geslacht- en Wapenkunde (1895-1900).

Note 

 
Family trees